Lobotos is a genus of bird in the cuckooshrike family Campephagidae.  It is sometimes included in the genus Campephaga.  It contains the following two species:
 Western wattled cuckooshrike (Lobotos lobatus)
 Eastern wattled cuckooshrike (Lobotos oriolinus)

References

Jønsson, K.A., R.C.K. Bowie, J.A.A. Nylander, L. Christidis, J.A. Norman, and J. Fjeldså. 2010a. Biogeographical history of cuckoo-shrikes (Aves: Passeriformes): transoceanic colonization of Africa from Australo-Papua. Journal of Biogeography 37: 1767–1781.

 
Bird genera
 
Taxa named by Ludwig Reichenbach